Sunil Kumar Pintu is an Indian politician. He was elected to the Lok Sabha, lower house of the Parliament of India from Sitamarhi, Bihar in the 2019 Indian general election as member of the Janata Dal (United). Pintu is also the president of the Shri Bhagwati Sita Tirtha Kshetra Samiti. Before 2019, he was a member of Bhartiya Janata Party; he had been a Member of Bihar Legislative Assembly from Sitamarhi Assembly constituency for four terms since 2003.

References

External links
Official biographical sketch in Parliament of India website

India MPs 2019–present
Lok Sabha members from Bihar
Living people
Janata Dal (United) politicians
1961 births